Shea Brian Morenz (born January 22, 1974) is an American businessman, strategist, philanthropist, and the CEO & President of Morenz Group and Bobcat Group. Morenz played collegiate football and baseball at the University of Texas before being drafted by the New York Yankees organization in the first round of the 1995 Major League Baseball draft.

Early life and education

Shea attended San Angelo Central High, where he excelled in academics and athletics and was named a First Team High School All American in both football and baseball. Morenz was the 1992 Texas Player of the Year in both football and baseball and played in two Texas High School Coaches All Star Games (football and baseball). He was inducted into the Bobcat Athletics Hall of Fame in 2010.

Upon graduation, Shea went on to attend the University of Texas on an athletics scholarship, where he started two years as Quarterback for the Texas Longhorns, was All-Southwest Conference First Team as a right fielder for the UT Baseball Team and was drafted in the 1st Round of the 1995 Major League Baseball Draft by the New York Yankees. He graduated with a Bachelor’s Degree in Finance and made the All-Southwest Conference Academic Honor list.

Career

Morenz was drafted with the 27th pick in the first round of the 1995 Major League Baseball Draft by the New York Yankees organization. He played four seasons with the organization and one season in the San Diego Padres system before retiring from professional baseball in 2000.

Following his baseball career, Morenz got his Master of Business Administration at the University of Michigan and began working at Goldman Sachs in 2001. Shea spent 10 years at the company and became a Managing Director in the Investment Management Division and Region Head for Private Wealth Management for the Southwest Region during his time there.

In 2011, Morenz joined Stratfor, a geopolitical intelligence firm, where he served as President & CEO before starting his own company.

Shea founded Morenz Group, a Houston-based holding company, in 2016, where he currently serves as President & CEO.

In 2017, Morenz Group launched their first operating platform, Bobcat Group, a privately held land, midstream and mineral rights company operating in the Midland Basin.

Philanthropy

Morenz is involved with a number of community organizations, including the Texas Business Leadership Council, the Board of Visitors for the Menninger Clinic, and the Navy Seal Foundation. He also serves on the Chancellor’s Council and Development Board for the University of Texas System  as well as the Advisory Council for the McCombs School of Business. Shea is the founder of the University of Texas 1883 Council, as well as a member of Young Presidents’ Organization, Austin Chapter.

References

External links
   Pro Baseball Statistics
   College Football Statistics

1974 births
Living people
American chief executives
American football quarterbacks
American investment bankers
Businesspeople from New Jersey
Goldman Sachs people
Sportspeople from Morris County, New Jersey
Texas Longhorns baseball players
Texas Longhorns football players
People from Denville, New Jersey
Arizona League Padres players
Greensboro Bats players
Las Vegas Stars (baseball) players
Mobile BayBears players
Norwich Navigators players
Oneonta Yankees players
Tampa Yankees players